Maic Malchow (born 11 October 1962) is a German former cyclist. He competed in the 1 km time trial event at the 1988 Summer Olympics.

References

External links
 

1962 births
Living people
East German male cyclists
Olympic cyclists of East Germany
Cyclists at the 1988 Summer Olympics
People from Borna
Cyclists from Saxony
People from Bezirk Leipzig